Etmet Musa, also known by her alias Ayo Leilani and her stage name Witch Prophet,  is an Ethiopian/Eritrean musician based in Toronto, Ontario. As Witch Prophet, she has released two albums: The Golden Octave (2018) and DNA Activation (2020). She co-founded and is the co-director of 88 Days of Fortune, a collective based in Toronto since 2009 that rebranded as Heart Lake Records in 2018. She also is a member of Above Top Secret, an electro-hip hop group. Above Top Secret has released three studio albums since 2010. DNA Activation was shortlisted for the 2020 Polaris Music Prize. In 2021, she released a new song "Leilani", which will appear on the deluxe edition of DNA Activation. The deluxe edition was released July 23, 2021. Her third album as Witch Prophet, entitled Gateway Experience, will be released May 3, 2023. The first single from the album, "Energy Vampire", was released on February 23, 2023 and featured DillanPonders.

Discography

With Above Top Secret

Studio albums 
dis rupt dis reality, (2010)
Siren Songs (2012)
Above Top Secret (2016)

As Witch Prophet

Studio albums 
The Golden Octave (2018)
DNA Activation (2020)
Gateway Experience (2023)

EPs 
H.P.B. (2016)
Architect of Heartbreak Remixes (2017)

References 

Living people
Canadian electronic musicians
Black Canadian musicians
Canadian LGBT musicians
Black Canadian LGBT people
Musicians from Toronto
1982 births
21st-century Canadian LGBT people